This is a list of television serial dramas released by TVB in 2015.

Top ten drama series in ratings
The following is a list of the highest-rated drama series released by TVB in 2015. The list includes premiere week, final week ratings, series finale ratings, as well as the average overall count of live Hong Kong viewers (in millions). The top five include overall ratings across all platforms.

Notes
A  Average numbers are derived from consolidated ratings as reported by Nielsen and on TVB's annual report. A consolidated rating is defined as the summation of TV ratings, online live rating, and online catch-up rating.

Awards

First line-up
These dramas air in Hong Kong from 8:00pm to 8:30pm, Monday to Friday on Jade.

Second line-up
These dramas air in Hong Kong from 8:30pm to 9:30pm, Monday to Friday on Jade.

Third line-up
These dramas aired in Hong Kong from 9:30pm to 10:30pm, Monday to Friday on Jade.

Starting on 26 April 2015, these dramas air in Hong Kong everyday from 9:30pm to 10:30pm on Jade.

Weekend dramas
These dramas air in Hong Kong every Saturday or Sunday night from 8.00pm to 9.00pm on Jade.

References

External links
TVB.com Official Website 

2015
2015 in Hong Kong television